Shamsi (شمسی) means of sun or solar in Arabic. It may refer to:

Places
Samsi, Malda
Shamsi, Iran
Shamsi, Nepal
Shamsi airfield, Balochistan, Pakistan
Shamshy, a village in Naryn Region, Kyrgyzstan
Shamshy, Chuy, a village in Chuy Region, Kyrgyzstan

People
Shamsi (name), a family name 
Samsi (Also spelt Shamsi), an Arab queen who reigned in the 8th century BC
Pertaining to or related to Shams ud-Din Iltutmish, Sultan of Delhi

Other
The Shamsīyah, a Mesopotamian sun-worshipping group
Shamsi Calendar, also known as the Iranian calendar
Shamsi (Also spelt Shemsi), a former sun-worshipping cult in Upper Mesopotamia

See also
 Şemsi (disambiguation)
 Shams (disambiguation)